The duodecimal system (also known as base 12, dozenal, or, rarely, uncial) is a positional notation numeral system using twelve as its base. The number twelve (that is, the number written as "12" in the decimal numerical system) is instead written as "10" in duodecimal (meaning "1 dozen and 0 units", instead of "1 ten and 0 units"), whereas the digit string "12" means "1 dozen and 2 units" (decimal 14). Similarly, in duodecimal, "100" means "1 gross", "1000" means "1 great gross", and "0.1" means "1 twelfth" (instead of their decimal meanings "1 hundred", "1 thousand", and "1 tenth", respectively).

The Dozenal Societies of America and Great Britain (organisations promoting the use of duodecimal) use turned digits in their published material: ↊ (a turned 2) for ten and ↋ (a turned 3) for eleven.

The number twelve, a superior highly composite number, is the smallest number with four non-trivial factors (2, 3, 4, 6), and the smallest to include as factors all four numbers (1 to 4) within the subitizing range, and the smallest abundant number. All multiples of reciprocals of 3-smooth numbers ( where  are integers) have a terminating representation in duodecimal. In particular,  (0.3),  (0.4),  (0.6),  (0.8), and  (0.9) all have a short terminating representation in duodecimal. There is also higher regularity observable in the duodecimal multiplication table. As a result, duodecimal has been described as the optimal number system.

In these respects, duodecimal is considered superior to decimal (which has only 2 and 5 as factors) and other proposed bases like octal or hexadecimal. Sexagesimal does even better in this respect (the reciprocals of all 5-smooth numbers terminate), but at the cost of unwieldy multiplication tables and a much larger number of symbols to memorize.

Origin 
In this section, numerals are based on decimal places. For example, 10 means ten, and 12 means twelve.

Languages using duodecimal number systems are uncommon. Languages in the Nigerian Middle Belt such as Janji, Gbiri-Niragu (Gure-Kahugu), Piti, and the Nimbia dialect of Gwandara; and the Chepang language of Nepal are known to use duodecimal numerals.

Germanic languages have special words for 11 and 12, such as eleven and twelve in English. They come from Proto-Germanic *ainlif and *twalif (meaning, respectively one left and two left), suggesting a decimal rather than duodecimal origin. However, Old Norse used a hybrid decimal/duodecimal counting system, with its words for "one hundred and eighty" meaning 200 and "two hundred" meaning 240. On British Isles, this style of counting survived well into the middle ages as the long hundred.

Historically, units of time in many civilizations are duodecimal. There are twelve signs of the zodiac, twelve months in a year, and the Babylonians had twelve hours in a day (although at some point this was changed to 24). Traditional Chinese calendars, clocks, and compasses are based on the twelve Earthly Branches or 24 (12×2) Solar terms. There are 12 inches in an imperial foot, 12 troy ounces in a troy pound, 12 old British pence in a shilling, 24 (12×2) hours in a day, and many other items counted by the dozen, gross (144, square of 12), or great gross (1728, cube of 12). The Romans used a fraction system based on 12, including the uncia which became both the English words ounce and inch. Pre-decimalisation, Ireland and the United Kingdom used a mixed duodecimal-vigesimal currency system (12 pence = 1 shilling, 20 shillings or 240 pence to the pound sterling or Irish pound), and Charlemagne established a monetary system that also had a mixed base of twelve and twenty, the remnants of which persist in many places.

The importance of 12 has been attributed to the number of lunar cycles in a year as well as the fact that humans have 12 finger bones (phalanges) on one hand (three in each of four fingers). It is possible to count to 12 with the thumb acting as a pointer, touching each finger bone in turn. A traditional finger counting system still in use in many regions of Asia works in this way and could help to explain the occurrence of numeral systems based on 12 and 60 besides those based on 10, 20, and 5. In this system, the one (usually right) hand counts repeatedly to 12, displaying the number of iterations on the other (usually left), until five dozens, i.e. the 60, are full.

Notations and pronunciations 
In a numbering system, the base (twelve for duodecimal) must be written as 10, but there are numerous proposals for how to write the quantities (counting values) "ten" and "eleven".

Transdecimal symbols

Frank Emerson Andrews, an early American advocate for duodecimal, suggested and used in his book New Numbers  (script capital E).

The symbols were chosen because they were available on some typewriters; they are also on push-button telephones. This notation was used in publications of the Dozenal Society of America (DSA) from 1974 to 2008.

From 2008 to 2015, the DSA used , the symbols devised by William Addison Dwiggins.

The Dozenal Society of Great Britain (DSGB) proposed symbols . This notation, derived from Arabic digits by 180° rotation, was introduced by Isaac Pitman. In March 2013, a proposal was submitted to include the digit forms for ten and eleven propagated by the Dozenal Societies in the Unicode Standard. They were included in Unicode 8.0 (2015).

After the Pitman digits were added to Unicode, the DSA took a vote and then began publishing content using the Pitman digits instead. They still use the letters X and E in ASCII text.

Other proposals are more creative or aesthetic; for example, many do not use any Arabic numerals under the principle of "separate identity."

Base notation
There are also varying proposals of how to distinguish a duodecimal number from a decimal one. They include italicizing duodecimal numbers "54 = 64", adding a "Humphrey point" (a semicolon instead of a decimal point) to duodecimal numbers "54;6 = 64.5", or some combination of the two. Others use subscript or affixed labels to indicate the base, allowing for more than decimal and duodecimal to be represented (for single letters 'z' from "dozenal" is used as 'd' would mean decimal) such as "54z = 64d," "5412 = 6410" or "doz 54 = dec 64."

Pronunciation 
The Dozenal Society of America suggested the pronunciation of ten and eleven as "dek" and "el". For the names of powers of twelve there are two prominent systems.

Duodecimal numbers
In this system, the prefix e- is added for fractions.

Multiple digits in this series are pronounced differently: 12 is "do two"; 30 is "three do"; 100 is "gro"; 9 is "el gro dek do nine"; 86 is "el gro eight do six"; 8,15 is "eight gro el do el, one gro five do dek" ABA is "dek gro el do dek" BBB is "el gro el do el" and 0.06 is "six egro" and so on.

Systematic Dozenal Nomenclature (SDN) 
This system uses "-qua" ending for the positive powers of 12 and "-cia" ending for the negative powers of 12, and an extension of the IUPAC systematic element names (with syllables dec and lev for the two extra digits needed for duodecimal) to express which power is meant.

Advocacy and "dozenalism"
William James Sidis used 12 as the base for his constructed language Vendergood in 1906, noting it being the smallest number with four factors and its prevalence in commerce.

The case for the duodecimal system was put forth at length in Frank Emerson Andrews' 1935 book New Numbers: How Acceptance of a Duodecimal Base Would Simplify Mathematics. Emerson noted that, due to the prevalence of factors of twelve in many traditional units of weight and measure, many of the computational advantages claimed for the metric system could be realized either by the adoption of ten-based weights and measure or by the adoption of the duodecimal number system.

Both the Dozenal Society of America and the Dozenal Society of Great Britain promote widespread adoption of the base-twelve system. They use the word "dozenal" instead of "duodecimal" to avoid the more overtly base-ten terminology. However, the etymology of "dozenal" itself is also an expression based on base-ten terminology since "dozen" is a direct derivation of the French word douzaine which is a derivative of the French word for twelve, douze, descended from Latin duodecim.

Since at least as far back as 1945 some members of the Dozenal Society of America and Dozenal Society of Great Britain have suggested that a more apt word would be "uncial". Uncial is a derivation of the Latin word uncia, meaning "one-twelfth", and also the base-twelve analogue of the Latin word decima, meaning "one-tenth".

Mathematician and mental calculator Alexander Craig Aitken was an outspoken advocate of duodecimal:

In media 
In "Little Twelvetoes", American television series Schoolhouse Rock! portrayed an alien being using base-twelve arithmetic, using "dek" and "el" as names for ten and eleven, and Andrews' script-X and script-E for the digit symbols.

Duodecimal systems of measurements 
Systems of measurement proposed by dozenalists include:
 Tom Pendlebury's TGM system
 Takashi Suga's Universal Unit System
 John Volan's Primel system

Comparison to other number systems 
The Dozenal Society of America argues that if a base is too small, significantly longer expansions are needed for numbers; and if a base is too large, one must memorise a large multiplication table to perform arithmetic. Thus it presumes that "a number base will need to be between about 7 or 8 through about 16, possibly including 18 and 20".

The number 12 has six factors, which are 1, 2, 3, 4, 6, and 12, of which 2 and 3 are prime. It is the smallest number to have six factors, the largest number to have at least half of the numbers below it as divisors, and is not much larger than 10. (The numbers 18 and 20 also have six factors, but are much larger.) The decimal system has only four factors, which are 1, 2, 5, and 10, of which 2 and 5 are prime. Senary (base 6) shares the prime factors 2 and 3 with duodecimal, but like decimal it has only four factors (1, 2, 3, and 6) instead of six, and it is below the DSA's stated threshold.

Octal (base 8) has four factors, 1, 2, 4 and 8, but has only one prime factor (2). Hexadecimal (base 16) adds 16 as a fifth factor, but still no additional prime. This is because 16=8×2, and 8 already contains 2 as a factor.

Trigesimal (base 30) is the smallest system that has three different prime factors (all of the three smallest primes: 2, 3 and 5) and it has eight factors in total (1, 2, 3, 5, 6, 10, 15, and 30). Sexagesimal — which the ancient Sumerians and Babylonians among others actually used—adds the four convenient factors 4, 12, 20, and 60 to this but no new prime factors. The smallest system that has four different prime factors is base 210 and the pattern follows the primorials. However, these are very large bases.

In all base systems, there are similarities to the representation of multiples of numbers which are one less than or one more than the base.

Conversion tables to and from decimal 
To convert numbers between bases, one can use the general conversion algorithm (see the relevant section under positional notation). Alternatively, one can use digit-conversion tables. To use them, the given number must first be decomposed into a sum of numbers with only one significant digit each. For example:

123,456.78 = 100,000 + 20,000 + 3,000 + 400 + 50 + 6 + 0.7 + 0.08

This decomposition works the same no matter what base the number is expressed in. Just isolate each non-zero digit, padding them with as many zeros as necessary to preserve their respective place values. If the digits in the given number include zeroes (for example, 102,304.05), these are, of course, left out in the digit decomposition (102,304.05 = 100,000 + 2,000 + 300 + 4 + 0.05). Then the digit conversion tables can be used to obtain the equivalent value in the target base for each digit. If the given number is in duodecimal and the target base is decimal, we get:

(duodecimal) 100,000 + 20,000 + 3,000 + 400 + 50 + 6 + 0;7 + 0;08 = (decimal) 248,832 + 41,472 + 5,184 + 576 + 60 + 6 + 0.58333333333... + 0.05555555555...

Now, because the summands are already converted to base ten, the usual decimal arithmetic is used to perform the addition and recompose the number, arriving at the conversion result:

 Duodecimal  ----->  Decimal

   100,000     =    248,832
    20,000     =     41,472
     3,000     =      5,184
       400     =        576
        50     =         60
  +      6     =   +      6
         0;7   =          0.58333333333...
         0;08  =          0.05555555555...
 --------------------------------------------
   123,456;78  =    296,130.63888888888...

That is, (duodecimal) 123,456.78 equals (decimal) 296,130.63 ≈ 296,130.64

If the given number is in decimal and the target base is duodecimal, the method is basically same. Using the digit conversion tables:

(decimal) 100,000 + 20,000 + 3,000 + 400 + 50 + 6 + 0.7 + 0.08 = (duodecimal) 49,54 + ,68 + 1,80 + 294 + 42 + 6 + 0;84972497249724972497... + 0;062...

However, in order to do this sum and recompose the number, now the addition tables for the duodecimal system have to be used, instead of the addition tables for decimal most people are already familiar with, because the summands are now in base twelve and so the arithmetic with them has to be in duodecimal as well. In decimal, 6 + 6 equals 12, but in duodecimal it equals 10; so, if using decimal arithmetic with duodecimal numbers one would arrive at an incorrect result. Doing the arithmetic properly in duodecimal, one gets the result:

   Decimal  ----->  Duodecimal

   100,000     =     49,54
    20,000     =      ,68
     3,000     =      1,80
       400     =        294
        50     =         42
  +      6     =   +      6
         0.7   =          0;84972497249724972497...
         0.08  =          0;062...
 --------------------------------------------------------
   123,456.78  =     5,540;943...

That is, (decimal) 123,456.78 equals (duodecimal) 5,540;9... ≈ 5,540;94

Duodecimal to decimal digit conversion

Decimal to duodecimal digit conversion

Divisibility rules
(In this section, all numbers are written with duodecimal)

This section is about the divisibility rules in duodecimal.

1
Any integer is divisible by 1.

2

3
If a number is divisible by 3 then the unit digit of that number will be 0, 3, 6 or 9.

4
If a number is divisible by 4 then the unit digit of that number will be 0, 4 or 8.

5
To test for divisibility by 5, double the units digit and subtract the result from the number formed by the rest of the digits. If the result is divisible by 5 then the given number is divisible by 5.

This rule comes from 21.

Examples: 
13        rule => , which is divisible by 5.
25    rule => , which is divisible by 5 (or apply the rule on 20).

OR

To test for divisibility by 5, subtract the units digit and triple of the result to the number formed by the rest of the digits. If the result is divisible by 5 then the given number is divisible by 5.

This rule comes from 13.

Examples: 
13        rule => , which is divisible by 5.
25    rule => , which is divisible by 5 (or apply the rule on 81).

OR

Form the alternating sum of blocks of two from right to left. If the result is divisible by 5 then the given number is divisible by 5.

This rule comes from 101, since ; thus, this rule can be also tested for the divisibility by 25.

Example:

97,374,627 => , which is divisible by 5.

6
If a number is divisible by 6 then the unit digit of that number will be 0 or 6.

7
To test for divisibility by 7, triple the units digit and add the result to the number formed by the rest of the digits. If the result is divisible by 7 then the given number is divisible by 7.

This rule comes from 2

Examples:
12     rule => , which is divisible by 7.
271    rule => , which is divisible by 7 (or apply the rule on 29).

OR

To test for divisibility by 7, subtract the units digit and double the result from the number formed by the rest of the digits. If the result is divisible by 7 then the given number is divisible by 7.

This rule comes from 12.

Examples:
12     rule => , which is divisible by 7.
271    rule => , which is divisible by 7 (or apply the rule on 513).

OR

To test for divisibility by 7, quadruple the units digit and subtract the result from the number formed by the rest of the digits. If the result is divisible by 7 then the given number is divisible by 7.

This rule comes from 41.

Examples:
12     rule => , which is divisible by 7.
271    rule => , which is divisible by 7 (or apply the rule on 235).

OR

Form the alternating sum of blocks of three from right to left. If the result is divisible by 7 then the given number is divisible by 7.

This rule comes from 1001, since , thus this rule can be also tested for the divisibility by 11 and 17.

Example:

386,967,443 => , which is divisible by 7.

8
If the 2-digit number formed by the last 2 digits of the given number is divisible by 8 then the given number is divisible by 8.

Example: 148, 4120
      rule => since 48(8*7) divisible by 8, then 148 is divisible by 8.
      rule => since 20(8*3) divisible by 8, then 4120 is divisible by 8.

9
If the 2-digit number formed by the last 2 digits of the given number is divisible by 9 then the given number is divisible by 9.

Example: 7423, 8330
      rule => since 23(9*3) divisible by 9, then 7423 is divisible by 9.
      rule => since 30(9*4) divisible by 9, then 8330 is divisible by 9.

Example: 29, 6113

10
If a number is divisible by 10 then the unit digit of that number will be 0.

11
Sum the alternate digits and subtract the sums. If the result is divisible by 11 the number is divisible by 11 (the equivalent of divisibility by eleven in decimal).

Example: 66, 9427
      rule => |6-6| = 0 which is divisible by 11, then 66 is divisible by 11.
      rule => |(9+2)-(4+7)| = |-| = 0 which is divisible by 11, then 9427 is divisible by 11.

12
If the number is divisible by 2 and 7 then the number is divisible by 12.

13
If the number is divisible by 3 and 5 then the number is divisible by 13.

14
If the 2-digit number formed by the last 2 digits of the given number is divisible by 14 then the given number is divisible by 14.

Example: 1468, 7394
      rule => since 68(14*5) divisible by 14, then 1468 is divisible by 14.
      rule => since 94(14*7) divisible by 14, then 7394 is divisible by 14.

Fractions and irrational numbers

Fractions
Duodecimal fractions may be simple:
  = 0;6
  = 0;4
  = 0;3
  = 0;2
  = 0;16
  = 0;14
  = 0;1  (this is a twelfth,  is a tenth)
  = 0;09 (this is a sixteenth,  is a fourteenth)

or complicated:
   = 0;... recurring (rounded to 0;24)
   = 0;... recurring (rounded to 0;187)
   = 0;1... recurring (rounded to 0;125)
   = 0;... recurring (rounded to 0;111)
  = 0;... recurring (rounded to 0;01)
  = 0;0... recurring (rounded to 0;03)
  = 0;0... recurring (rounded to 0;097)

As explained in recurring decimals, whenever an irreducible fraction is written in radix point notation in any base, the fraction can be expressed exactly (terminates) if and only if all the prime factors of its denominator are also prime factors of the base. 

Because , in the duodecimal system,  is exact;  and  recur because they include 5 as a factor;  is exact; and  recurs, just as it does in decimal.

The number of denominators which give terminating fractions within a given number of digits, say n, in a base b is the number of factors (divisors) of bn, the nth power of the base b (although this includes the divisor 1, which does not produce fractions when used as the denominator). The number of factors of bn is given using its prime factorization.

For decimal, .

For example, the number 8 is a factor of 103 (1000), so 1/8 and other fractions with a denominator of 8 cannot require more than 3 fractional decimal digits to terminate. 5/8 = 0.62510

For duodecimal, . This has  divisors. The sample denominator of 8 is a factor of a gross  in decimal), so eighths cannot need more than two duodecimal fractional places to terminate. 

Recurring digits 
The Dozenal Society of America argues that factors of 3 are more commonly encountered in real-life division problems than factors of 5. Thus, in practical applications, the nuisance of repeating decimals is encountered less often when duodecimal notation is used. Advocates of duodecimal systems argue that this is particularly true of financial calculations, in which the twelve months of the year often enter into calculations.

However, when recurring fractions do occur in duodecimal notation, they are less likely to have a very short period than in decimal notation, because 12 (twelve) is between two prime numbers, 11 (eleven) and 13 (thirteen), whereas ten is adjacent to the composite number 9. Nonetheless, having a shorter or longer period doesn't help the main inconvenience that one does not get a finite representation for such fractions in the given base (so rounding, which introduces inexactitude, is necessary to handle them in calculations), and overall one is more likely to have to deal with infinite recurring digits when fractions are expressed in decimal than in duodecimal, because one out of every three consecutive numbers contains the prime factor 3 in its factorization, whereas only one out of every five contains the prime factor 5. All other prime factors, except 2, are not shared by either ten or twelve, so they do not
influence the relative likeliness of encountering recurring digits (any irreducible fraction that contains any of these other factors in its denominator will recur in either base). 

Also, the prime factor 2 appears twice in the factorization of twelve, whereas only once in the factorization of ten; which means that most fractions whose denominators are powers of two will have a shorter, more convenient terminating representation in duodecimal than in decimal:

 1/(22) = 0.2510 = 0.312
 1/(23) = 0.12510 = 0.1612
 1/(24) = 0.062510 = 0.0912
 1/(25) = 0.0312510 = 0.04612

The duodecimal period length of 1/n are (in decimal)
0, 0, 0, 0, 4, 0, 6, 0, 0, 4, 1, 0, 2, 6, 4, 0, 16, 0, 6, 4, 6, 1, 11, 0, 20, 2, 0, 6, 4, 4, 30, 0, 1, 16, 12, 0, 9, 6, 2, 4, 40, 6, 42, 1, 4, 11, 23, 0, 42, 20, 16, 2, 52, 0, 4, 6, 6, 4, 29, 4, 15, 30, 6, 0, 4, 1, 66, 16, 11, 12, 35, 0, ... 

The duodecimal period length of 1/(nth prime) are (in decimal)
0, 0, 4, 6, 1, 2, 16, 6, 11, 4, 30, 9, 40, 42, 23, 52, 29, 15, 66, 35, 36, 26, 41, 8, 16, 100, 102, 53, 54, 112, 126, 65, 136, 138, 148, 150, 3, 162, 83, 172, 89, 90, 95, 24, 196, 66, 14, 222, 113, 114, 8, 119, 120, 125, 256, 131, 268, 54, 138, 280, ... 

Smallest prime with duodecimal period n are (in decimal)
11, 13, 157, 5, 22621, 7, 659, 89, 37, 19141, 23, 20593, 477517, 211, 61, 17, 2693651, 1657, 29043636306420266077, 85403261, 8177824843189, 57154490053, 47, 193, 303551, 79, 306829, 673, 59, 31, 373, 153953, 886381, 2551, 71, 73, ...

Irrational numbers 
The representations of irrational numbers in any positional number system (including decimal and duodecimal) neither terminate nor repeat.  The following table gives the first digits for some important algebraic and transcendental numbers in both decimal and duodecimal.

See also 
 Vigesimal (base 20)
 Sexagesimal (base 60)

References

Further reading
 
  (NB. Also has information on duodecimal representations.)

External links 
 Dozenal Society of America
 Dozenal Society of Great Britain
 Duodecimal calculator
 Comprehensive Synopsis of Dozenal and Transdecimal Symbologies

Positional numeral systems
12 (number)